Heiheionakeiki is a Polynesian constellation which mariners used to navigate to Tahiti.  It contains the seven main stars of the western constellation Orion:
 Rigel
 Betelgeuse
 Alnilam
 Alnitak
 Mintaka
 Bellatrix
 Saiph

As all of Hawaiian Airlines’s Airbus A330-200s are named for a constellation or star used by the ancient Polynesians for celestial navigation when making their voyages across the Pacific to Hawaii, the airline has named its seventh Airbus A330-200 (N386HA) aircraft after the constellation.

References

Polynesian navigation
Polynesian culture
Constellations